Eduardo Mario Arencibia (born September 25, 1924) is a Cuban former baseball outfielder in the Negro leagues and in the Mexican League. He played from 1948 to 1953 with several teams.

References

External links
 and Baseball-Reference Black Baseball / Mexican League Stats and  Seamheads

1924 births
Possibly living people
People from Encrucijada
Charros de Jalisco players
Cuban baseball players
Diablos Rojos del México players
Indios de Anahuac players
Mexican League baseball outfielders
New York Cubans players
Tuneros de San Luis Potosí players
Baseball outfielders
21st-century African-American people